Our Lady of the Atonement Cathedral, better known as Baguio Cathedral, is a Roman Catholic cathedral located at Cathedral Loop adjacent to Session Road in Baguio, the Philippines, and is the see of the Roman Catholic Diocese of Baguio. 

Dedicated to the Blessed Virgin Mary under the title of Our Lady of Atonement, its distinctive exterior, twin spires and stained glass windows make it a popular tourist attraction in Baguio. It served as an evacuation center under the Japanese Occupation during Second World War.

History
In 1907, a Catholic mission chapel, dedicated to St. Patrick, was established by Belgian missionaries from the Congregatio Immaculati Cordis Mariae. The site where the cathedral currently stands was a hill referred to as Kampo by the Ibaloi people. Construction of the cathedral itself began in 1920 under the leadership of the parish priest, Rev Florimond Carlu. The building was completed and consecrated in 1936. It was dedicated to Our Lady of Atonement.

During the Second World War, the cathedral was an evacuation centre, and it withstood the carpet-bombing of Baguio by Allied forces during liberation on 15 March 1945. The remains of the thousands that had died in the bombardment are interred within the cathedral precinct.

In February 1986, antidictatorship organizers based in the Azotea Building and in Cafe Amapola on Session Road learned that the People Power revolution had begun in Manila. Deciding that their locations were too unsafe, they encamped in the courtyard of the Baguio Cathedral, which was located on higher ground.  Thus, the cathedral became the site where Baguio residents had gathered to protest the abuses of the Marcos administration - their own contribution to the largely peaceful People Power revolution.

Features
The cathedral has a distinctive façade with a rose window and twin square belfries with pyramidal roofs. Within its large courtyard is a viewing deck that overlooks Session Road and the downtown commercial district of Baguio.

The cathedral is accessible to pedestrians from Session Road via 104-step stone staircase that ends at a Calvary, or through the adjacent campus of Saint Louis University.

A mural on the cathedral grounds, carved by Baguio artist Clinton Pagao Aniversario in 2017, honors the missionaries of the Congregatio Immaculati Cordis Mariae (CICM) who first began Roman Catholic evangelical work in Mountain Province in the 1900s, and were eventually instrumental in the building of the cathedral.

See also
Roman Catholicism in the Philippines

Gallery

References

External links

 Official website

References

Roman Catholic churches in Benguet
Roman Catholic churches completed in 1936
Roman Catholic cathedrals in the Philippines
Buildings and structures in Baguio
Tourist attractions in Baguio
Landmarks in the Philippines
20th-century Roman Catholic church buildings in the Philippines
Neoclassical church buildings in the Philippines